Painter's Cave is a cave in the British Overseas Territory of Gibraltar.

It is located close to Royal Naval Hospital. It is a narrow cave, approximately 5–6 meters long. It has an entrance about 3 meters high. The cave has old graffiti from 1877 when was discovered. It has two floors loosely connected and various rock formations.

See also
List of caves in Gibraltar

References

Caves of Gibraltar